Lincoln Kinnear Barnett (1909–1979) was an editor and author, most notably at Life Magazine for many years.

Lincoln Barnett wrote a number of books, including "The Universe and Doctor Einstein",
"The World We Live In", 
and "The Treasure of Our Tongue".

The Universe and Doctor Einstein is a layman's introduction to the theory of relativity.  It includes a foreword  by Albert Einstein, and has been reprinted several times. His work popularizing science subjects included consulting work on the film Journey to the Center of the Earth.

Notes

External links

1909 births
1979 deaths
Life (magazine) people
American magazine editors
20th-century American non-fiction writers
20th-century American male writers
American male non-fiction writers